Percilla, also known as Evergreen, is an unincorporated community in Houston County, Texas.  It is located at the intersections of FM's 2022 and 228 6 miles from Grapeland. The town was founded in 1880 as Evergreen, and the name was changed in 1891. By the 1990s it became a dispersed community.  The most recent population estimate is 95 in 2000.

References

Unincorporated communities in Texas
Unincorporated communities in Houston County, Texas